Carlo Gaddi (born 5 February 1962 in Lecco) is an Italian rower.

References
 
 

1962 births
Living people
Italian male rowers
Sportspeople from Lecco
Rowers at the 1988 Summer Olympics
Rowers at the 1996 Summer Olympics
Rowers at the 2000 Summer Olympics
Olympic rowers of Italy
World Rowing Championships medalists for Italy